Begodya is a type of Korean steamed buns which is similar to jjinppang. The dish is popular among Koreans living in the Uzbek region. The buns can be filled with various meats and cabbage.

The dish is a popular menu item at Cafe Lily, an Uzbek-Korean restaurant, located in Brooklyn, New York City.

Variations 
 Bungeo-ppang
 Hoppang

See also 
 Jjinppang

References 

Beef dishes
Korean meat dishes
Korean cuisine